Niral Rashmikant Mehta (born on 28 October 1976) is an Indian Judge. Presently, he is a Judge of Gujarat High Court.

Life 
Justice Niral R. Mehta was born on 28 October 1976 in Ahmedabad, Gujarat India.

He studied Bachelor of Commerce from H L College for Commerce, Ahmedabad, and L.L.B from Sir L.A. Shah College, Ahmedabad.

References 

1976 births
Living people